Ulrike Haage (born in Kassel, lives and works in Berlin) is a German pianist and composer, producer for radio plays and a sound artist.

Biography

The jazz years 
Ulrike Haage spent her childhood in Ruhr. She grew up listening to the big jazz record collection of her parents and trained to play piano listening to masters as Bill Evans and Thelonious Monk, improvising. As a teenager she started singing and playing guitar in a garage-band.

After studying music and music therapy at Musikhochschule Hamburg, she stayed on an taught improvisation and orchestra direction from 1985 to 1989. During this time she begins to compose and starts playing piano for the first German Female Jazz band: Reichlich Weiblich. While working with Peter Zadek on the theatre play Andi, she meets FM Einheit. With him, Alfred 23 Harth and Phil Minton, the group Vladimir Estragon is founded, where Ulrike begins to introduce electronic music. A year later, because of the departure of Alfred Harth, the quartet becomes the trio GOTO, with the vocal acrobatics of Phil Minton.

Pop and theatre years
In 1990, she joins Katharina Franck in the pop group Rainbirds, which is already facing recognition (their first album Rainbirds attained gold record). They release Two faces and In A Different Light .
Between tours and recordings for the Rainbirds and the theatre music group Stein (Katharina Franck, FM Einheit) Ulrike Haage works at theaters in Zurich (Uwe Eric Laufenberg), Düsseldorf (Kazuko Watanabe.) and Berlin (e.g. The Ballade of Narayama with Kazuko Watanabe)
In 1999 a close collaboration with the actress Meret Becker begins. In addition she becomes the music director of the concert’s program Nachtmahr and records the CD Fragiles.
With the translator and publisher Sylvia de Hollanda (Pociao's Books), she founds Sans Soleil, a publishing house for books and radio plays.

German jazz award: Alfred Mangelsdorff Preis 
In 2003 Ulrike Haage becomes the first and up to then the youngest woman to win the German Jazz Award. Markus Müller, presenting the award, pays tribute "to her outstanding and truly versatile life-work that permanently reinvents itself ». He emphasizes her artistic way through pop, art and avant-garde.

The solo period, not so solo
Sélavy, her first instrumental solo album is released in 2004. In the next two years, the Goethe Institut of Moscow  invites her to tour the cities along the Wolga and Siberia, playing concerts and giving workshops.
In 2006, she records her second solo album Weißes Land.
Since then, she participates among other projects in the Ring with choreographer Felix Ruckert and musician Christian Meyer, where she plays simultaneously to the choreography happening in front of her in interaction with the dancers.

2007, she becomes an artist-in-residence at the Hartung-Bergman foundation, composing a "dialogue", a music piece for chamber vibraphone, marimbaphone and electronics (Nunatak), in correspondence to the paintings of Anna-Eva Bergman 
and produces more and more radio plays for the German public radio. For example, Alles aber Anders (2009), a radio play for the Bavarian Radio, Bayerischer Rundfunk, after the diary of the sculptor Eva Hesse. For the celebration of the 90th Anniversary of the Bauhaus, she performs her radio play Der Kreis ist rot, after the diary of Oskar Schlemmer. 
The opera radio play Amnesie der Ozeane in collaboration with Stephan Krass, is produced in 2010, as is the music for the sound-book Heimsuchung (novel by Jenny Erpenbeck). Between concerts and conferences her third solo album In:finitum is in the making and released in 2011.

In 2012 Ulrike Haage spends 3 months at the artist-residence Villa Kamagowa in Kyoto, Japan. Here the idea for the composition of For all my walking takes root. Another artist-in-residence program, this time at the Leuphana Universität Lüneburg, is where she produces an audio-visual piece between sound and silence, which deals with the subject of public space as a sound space.

2015 saw the release (September 4) of her fourth solo album Maelstrom. The same year the production of two radio plays Lockbuch and Geld were finished and the composition of the soundtrack to the new Doris Dörrie film Grüße aus Fukushima, which was running at the 66th Berlinale International Film Festival, was recorded. Also showing at the 2016 Berlinale was the film Landstück by German filmmaker Volker Koepp featuring music by Ulrike Haage.

Influences 
When you listen to her music, you can go to the quest for the different musics which have had a strong influence on her style. Of course, there is the jazz – since her debuts with the records of her parents, up to her first jazz-band. Her compositions, even today leave a big part to improvisation. Oft one could find on her partitions  only an indication of chord on which she will improvise during the concert. 
Her very thorough and classic training of music brings an instrumental acuteness and sharpness to her music. Each break is controlled, each period has its sens. She puts her music together using repetitions of more or less long terms, according to the tradition of the ostinato.
Music is not her sole inspiration, she is also an artist with words. She works with them as she works with musical subjects. A lot of these play-on-words have an artist´s words for inspiration. Alles aber Anders, from Eva Hesse´s journal, is a particularly interesting example; she repeats certain words according to a particular rhythm, replaced by a sound, until exhaustion. Just like these visual artists (Eva Hesse, Louise Bourgeois), whose words she puts into music, we can hear breaks, "flat areas", as if she were drawing musical landscapes with big streaks of colors.

Ulrike Haage herself is an influence to new artists such as Nepomuk, who remixed "Magic Waters".

Defining the "genre" 
How could her music, taking inspiration in the whole music history, be defined? electro-jazz? nu-jazz? film soundtrack? theatre music? and what about the piano? and the more classic parts? Ulrike Haage is constantly redefining her music and her way of composing and creating. She flees in order to invent a new writing each time.
An adjective stands out: eclectic. Then, others come to mind; still, light, crystalline. Maybe the time has come, as Frédéric Derval said it, to forget about the encompassing "genres" and names in order to find a new way to express music.

Discography 
 Grüße aus Fukushima (2016), BPM, soundtrack
 Maelstrom (solo album, 2015), BPM
 Erzählung des Gleichgewichts 4:W (2015) Blue Pearls (Indigo)
 Das verschwundene M (2014) soundtrack 
 For all my walking (2014), Sans Soleil
 Meret Oppenheim: Eine Surrealistin auf eigenen Wegen (2013) DVD 
 Flügel und Katze. Musik für Kinder (2012)
 Ema. Akte auf der Treppe (2011) soundtrack 
 Ana:mnesis (2011), BPM
 In:finitum (solo album, 2011), BPM
 Goldrausch (2011), BPM, soundtrack
 Zwiebelfische (2010) DVD, soundtrack
 Edition Filmmusik - Komponiert in Deutschland #13: Ulrike Haage (2010), NORMAL Records
 Le Pianoscope (2007) Edition UBM/Universal Publishing Production Music GmbH
 Weißes Land (solo album, 2006), content records
 Sélavy (solo album, 2004) content records

Reichlich Weiblich - Live in Moers (1987)

Vladimir Estragon (mit Alfred Harth, FM Einheit, Phil Minton) - Three Quarks for Muster Mark (1989)

Rainbirds - 3000.live (1999), Forever (1997), Making Memory (1996), The Mercury Years (1995), In a Different Light (1993), Two Faces (1991)

Gruppe Stein (Katharina Franck und FM Einheit) - König Zucker (1994), Steinzeit (1992)

Goto - Goto, Phil Minton, FM Einheit, Haage (1995)

Filmography 
 Landstück (Vineta Film & RBB, D 2016) directed by Volker Koepp, music by Ulrike Haage
 Grüße aus Fukushima (OLGA FILM, D 2016) directed by Doris Dörrie, music by Ulrike Haage
 Snapshot Mon Amour. Haiku-short film (thede filmproduktion, D 2015) a film by Christian Bau, music by Ulrike Haage
 Das verschwundene M (thede filmproduktion, D 2014) directed by Maria Hemmleb, music by Ulrike Haage
 Meret Oppenheim: Eine Surrealistin auf eigenen Wegen (Kobalt Productions, D 2013) directed by Daniela Schmidt-Langels, music by Ulrike Haage
 Ema. Akt auf Treppe (zero one film, SWR & ARTE, D 2012) directed by Corinna Belz, music byUlrike Haage
 Goldrausch (zero one film, SWR, NDR & MDR, D 2012) produced by Thomas Kufus, music by Ulrike Haage
 Zwiebelfische (thede filmproduktion, D 2010) a film by Christian Bau & Artur Dickhoff, music by Ulrike Haage

Radio Plays
 Geld (DKultur, 2015) text: Gertrude Stein, direction and composition: Ulrike Haage
 Lockbuch (NDR2, 2015) text: Nora Gomringer und Annemarie Bostroem, direction and composition: Ulrike Haage
 The Moon Tapes (SWR, 2014), Stephan Krass, Ulrike Haage, composition for the SWR vocal ensemble und 3 narrators
 Der Kreis ist rot (WDR3, 2014) feature about the Bauhausmeister Oskar Schlemmer
 Die magische Pfeilspitze (WDR5, KiRaKa, 2013) for children
 Orlando (BR, 2013), Random House 
 Alle Vögel fliegen hoch (BR2,[6] 2012) after the stories by the painter Leonora Carrington
 Erzählung des Gleichgewichts 4:W (DKultur, 2012) text: Jean Daive, composition: Ulrike Haage
 Nichts. Was im Leben wichtig ist (SWR2, 2011) Janne Teller, Ulrike Haage
 Wenn ich vier Dromedare hätte (WDR3, 2011) feature about the film essayist Chris Marker
 Heimsuchung (BR2, 2009) novel by Jenny Erpenbeck
 Amnesie der Ozeane (SWR2, 2009)
 Alles aber anders (BR, 2009), from the diaries by Eva Hesse, Sans Soleil
 Der Wind in der Weiden (WDR, 2008), after the text by Kenneth Grahame
 Die Stille hinter den Worten (BR, 2008)
 Pikdame. Pamphletes and letters by Nancy Cunard (BR, 2006)
 Exakte Vision (BR, 2004), Ulrike Vosswinkel, Ulrike Haage, Sans Soleil
 Ding fest machen (BR, 2003), after the writings by Louise Bourgeois, Sans Soleil
 Bombsong (HR, 2002), Thea Dorn, Ulrike Haage (commission for Frankfurter Positionen),Sans Soleil
 Reise, Toter (BR, 2001) Durs Grünbein, Ulrike Haage, Sans Soleil
 Last Words : Qui Vivre Verra (BR, 2001), W. S. Burroughs, Ulrike Haage, Barbara Schäfer, Sans Soleil
 Die Wüste Lop Nor (BR, 2000), Raoul Schrott, Musik von Ulrike Haage, HÖR Verlag, 2000
 Bei unserer Lebensweise ist es sehr angenehm, lange im voraus zu einer Party eingeladen zu werden (BR, 1999), Jane Bowles, Katharina Franck, Ulrike Haage), Sans Soleil
 Odysseus 7 (BR, 1998), Ammer, Einheit, Haage ; FM 4.5.1
 7 Dances Of The Holy Ghost (BR, 1998), Ammer, Haage, Sans Soleil
 Apokalypse live (BR, 1994), Ammer, Einheit, Haage, Hörspielpreis der Kriegsblinden, Special Prize for Fiction des Prix Italia 1995, Verlag: FM 4.5.1

Other projects

 Schlachtplatte, 1998 with the Stein group, German operette from the Ring, produced by the  Marstall Theater München.
 Imaginary Landscapes, podcasts cklab.

Collaborations 
 Fragiles (2001), Meret Becker, Buddy Sacher, Ulrike Haage
 Music for the bonus of the DVD Requiem by Hans-Christian Schmid, 2007

Sources 
This article is based on translation of article on the German Wikipedia and the French one Ulrike Haage, as from her internet site myspace.

The biography extracted from Creative Europe was consulted also this one hardscore.de.

Further reading 
Ulrike Haage, « Klanggefüttert im Dunkeln nach Hause », in Räumungen – Von der Unverschämtheit, Theater für ein Medium der Zukunft zu halten, Acte du colloque dirigé par Ralph Hammerthaler et Elisabeth Schweeger, p. 104-107, Berlin, Alexander, 2000. 
Ulrike Haage, « Meine Sehnsucht nach Musik im Theater », in TheaterPeripherien, p. 221-227, Tübingen, Konkursbuchverlag Claudia Gehrke, 2001.

References

External links 
 Official Site
 Edition Sans Soleil
 Rainbirds Official Site

German pianists
German women pianists
German composers
1957 births
Living people
Musicians from Kassel
21st-century pianists
21st-century women pianists